Cushley is a surname. Notable people with the surname include:

David Cushley (born 1989), Northern Ireland footballer
John Cushley (1943–2008), Scottish footballer
Leo Cushley (born 1961), Scottish Roman Catholic archbishop
Lisa Cushley (born 1969), English pair skater
Neil Cushley (born 1967), English pair skater